Shompen Village-A is a village in the Nicobar district of Andaman and Nicobar Islands, India. It is located in the Great Nicobar tehsil.

Demographics 

Along with Shompen Village-B, the village has the highest population of Shompen people. Before the 2004 Indian Ocean earthquake and tsunami, the village was home to 103 Shompens. However, by the time of the 2011 census, only 10 people were left in the village.

According to the 2011 census of India, Shompen Village-A has 2 households. The effective literacy rate (i.e. the literacy rate of population excluding children aged 6 and below) is 0%.

References 

Villages in Great Nicobar tehsil